Alexander Gennadievich Koreshkov (born 28 October 1968) is a retired Kazakhstani professional ice hockey left winger who last competed at the 2010 IIHF World Championship as a member of the Kazakhstan men's national ice hockey team. He is the older brother of Evgeni Koreshkov. He is currently serving as a president of the Kontinental Hockey League team Barys Astana and a general manager of the Kazakhstan men's national ice hockey team. He competed at the 1998 Winter Olympics and the 2006 Winter Olympics.

Career statistics

Regular season and playoffs

International

References

External links

1968 births
Living people
Barys Nur-Sultan players
Expatriate ice hockey players in Russia
HC Mechel players
Metallurg Magnitogorsk players
HC Sibir Novosibirsk players
Ice hockey players at the 1998 Winter Olympics
Ice hockey players at the 2006 Winter Olympics
Kazakhstani ice hockey left wingers
Kazzinc-Torpedo players
Olympic ice hockey players of Kazakhstan
Sportspeople from Oskemen
Severstal Cherepovets players
Soviet ice hockey left wingers
Asian Games silver medalists for Kazakhstan
Medalists at the 2007 Asian Winter Games
Asian Games medalists in ice hockey
Ice hockey players at the 2007 Asian Winter Games